Washaqua Hill is a mountain in Dukes County, Massachusetts. It is on Martha's Vineyard on 
Sampson Hill is located northwest and Mill Hill is located west-northwest of Washaqua Hill.

References

Mountains of Massachusetts
Mountains of Dukes County, Massachusetts